Chatzakia is a genus of spiders in the family Gnaphosidae. It was first described in 2016 by Lissner & Bosmans. This genus was named in honour of the Greek arachnologist Maria Chatzaki. , it contains only one species, Chatzakia balearica, found on the Balearic Islands.

References

Gnaphosidae
Monotypic Araneomorphae genera